is an island and former city in Hiroshima Prefecture, Japan. The island is located within the Geiyo Islands of the Seto Inland Sea. The city was founded on May 1, 1953.

, the city had an estimated population of 27,465 and a population density of 690.77 persons per km2. The total area was 39.76 km².

On January 10, 2006, Innoshima, along with the town of Setoda (from Toyota District), was merged into the expanded city of Onomichi.

Local government

Tourist site
Mount Shirataki
Innoshima Park

Geographic information

Transportation
There is a ferry which comes/goes from/to Onomichi Station  Onomichi, Hiroshima and Setoda, Hiroshima, Sagi, Hiroshima from/to Shigei-higashi Port in this island．
There is a ferry which comes/goes from/to Mihara Station Mihara, Hiroshima from/to, Ikina, Hiroshima, from/to Shigei-nishi Port,Innoshima Mall and Habu Port in this island．
There is a ferry which comes/goes from/to Imabari Station Imabari, Ehime from/to, Nagae, Hiroshima, from/to Habu Port in this island．

References

External links
Innoshima Municipal Tourist Information Official Website

Dissolved municipalities of Hiroshima Prefecture
Islands of the Seto Inland Sea